The Wardell Court Historic Residential District in Rock Springs, Wyoming is a  historic district that was listed on the U.S. National Register of Historic Places in 1997.  It included 14 contributing buildings and six other buildings in a one-block area.  These are all the buildings of a Wardell Court planned community that was formed by the Union Pacific
Coal Company during 1920 to 1921 to house company officials.  It includes Colonial Revival, Greek Revival, and Bungalow/craftsman architecture.

References

External links
 Wardell Court Historic Residential at the Wyoming State Historic Preservation Office District

Residential buildings on the National Register of Historic Places in Wyoming
Colonial Revival architecture in Wyoming
Greek Revival architecture in Wyoming
Buildings and structures in Rock Springs, Wyoming
Historic districts on the National Register of Historic Places in Wyoming
National Register of Historic Places in Sweetwater County, Wyoming